The 1943–44 season was the 17th season of competitive football in the British Mandate for Palestine under the Eretz Israel Football Association.

IFA Competitions

1941–42 Palestine League

League matches, which started during the previous season were completed during the season with a single match played in the southern division and the final round play-offs. Maccabi Rishon LeZion won the southern division and qualified to the playoffs, along with second placed Maccabi Tel Aviv and Jerusalem division winner, Homenetmen Jerusalem. In the play-offs, Maccabi Tel Aviv won both its matches against Maccabi Rishon LeZion, while Homenetmen withdrew after playing one match, forfeiting the rest of its fixtures, and Maccabi Tel Aviv was declared league champions.

Southern League

Championship play-off

1943–44 Palestine League

League matches began on 11 September 1943 However, the league matches were not completed by the end of the season, and were continued after the summer break.

League table (top 5)

1943 Palestine Cup

A cup competition was held during the previous season, in spring 1943, which was called The Wartime Cup, with the semi-finals and final being delayed over the summer break. The final, between Hapoel Jerusalem and a Royal Artillery XI was played on 16 October 1943, with the Gunners winning 7–1.

1944 Palestine Cup

The competition started on 19 February 1944, but was delayed over the summer break and were completed during the following season.

Notable events
Between  28 August and 6 September, Al Ahly Cairo visited Mandatory Palestine. The team was billed as Cairo All Stars as the visit was against the Egyptian FA decision. The visiting team played five matches, three against the Jewish team: Beitar Tel Aviv, losing the first match 1–3, winning the second 2–0 and winning the third 4-1, and two against selected Arab XI teams from Jerusalem, winning 4–2, and Haifa, winning 4–0.Prior to Al Ahly's first match against Beitar Tel Aviv, the Egyptian FA notified the EIFA that Al Ahly's visit was against EFA decisions and asked to forbid any matches against Al Ahly. The EIFA notified Beitar Tel Aviv, which decided to go on with the planned match on 28 August 1943 and with the entire tour. Beitar Tel Aviv was suspended from all activities, forcing the team to forfeit its cup semi-final match against Hapoel Jerusalem, and in October 1943 was given a six months suspension, a 12 months ban on matches against foreign teams and a 50 PP fine.
 On 15 April 1944, Hapoel Haifa won the Haifa Cup for the third consecutive year, after beating British army team All White 3–2 and 6–2 in the two legged final.
 In early July 1944, a Maccabi Palestine XI took a brief tour to Lebanon, playing two matches, against Homenetmen, losing 2–3, and against a Beirut XI, losing 0–1.

References